Ko Bergman (16 December 1913 – 19 November 1982) was a Dutch footballer. He played in eight matches for the Netherlands national football team from 1937 to 1947.

References

External links
 

1913 births
1982 deaths
Dutch footballers
Netherlands international footballers
Footballers from Amsterdam
Association football forwards
Blauw-Wit Amsterdam players